Fortress of the Yuan-Ti is an adventure module for the 3.5 edition of the Dungeons & Dragons fantasy role-playing game.

Plot summary
Fortress of the Yuan-Ti involves evil yuan-ti who conspire to destroy a kingdom using dark rituals and the bones of a long-dead king.  The player characters must storm the yuan-ti fortress and take the bones from the cultists before they complete their rituals and unleash a far greater menace upon the world.

Publication history
Fortress of the Yuan-Ti was written by Ari Marmell, and was published in September 2007. Cover art was by Steve Prescott, with interior art by Dave Griffith.

Reception

References

Dungeons & Dragons modules
Role-playing game supplements introduced in 2007